The 1930 United States Senate election in Oklahoma took place on November 4, 1930. Incumbent Republican Senator William B. Pine ran for re-election to a second term. In the Democratic primary, former U.S. Senator Thomas Gore emerged victorious in a crowded Democratic primary that included three former Governors and one of the first female candidates for statewide office. He won a slim plurality in the initial election and defeated C. J. Wrightsman, an oilman from Tulsa, in the runoff by a wide margin. In the general election, aided by the national Democratic landslide, Gore narrowly defeated Pine, returning to the Senate for one final term.

Democratic primary

Candidates
 Thomas Gore, former U.S. Senator
 C. J. Wrightsman, Tulsa oilman, 1924 Democratic candidate for the U.S. Senate
 Henry S. Johnston, former Governor of Oklahoma
 Lee Cruce, former Governor of Oklahoma
 James B. A. Robertson, former Governor of Oklahoma
 Charles W. Harris
 Kathryn Van Leuven, former Assistant Attorney General of Oklahoma
 William L. McCann
 E. G. Barnard
 Woodson E. Norvell

Results

Runoff election results

Republican primary

Candidates
 William B. Pine, incumbent U.S. Senator
 Charles J. Benson
 J. J. Bebout

Results

General election

Results

References

Oklahoma
1930
1930 Oklahoma elections